Walking is a 1968 Canadian animated short film directed and produced by Ryan Larkin for the National Film Board of Canada, composed of animated vignettes of how different people walk.

Following Larkin's work on In the Labyrinth for Expo 67, Larkin submitted a proposal to the NFB for a short film based on sketches of people walking. It took him two years to make the film—twice as long as expected—as he was perfecting new ink wash painting techniques in order to not repeat his earlier films. He was also absorbed in exploring human movements and behavior, even setting up mirrors in his small studio to study his own motions.

It was nominated for an Academy Award for Best Animated Short Film at the 42nd Academy Awards. Excerpts from the film also appear in the Oscar-winning short about Larkin, Ryan.

Walking was one of seven NFB animated shorts acquired by the American Broadcasting Company, marking the first time NFB films had been sold to a major American television network. It aired on ABC in the fall of 1971 as part of the children's television show Curiosity Shop, executive produced by Chuck Jones.

Awards
 21st Canadian Film Awards, Toronto: Genie Award for Best Animated Film 1969
 Chicago International Film Festival, Chicago:  Gold Hugo for Best Animated Film, 1969
 American Film and Video Festival, New York: Blue Ribbon, 1969
 Adelaide International Film Festival, Adelaide: Silver Southern Cross Plaque, 1969
 Kraków Film Festival, Kraków: Award of the Science and Art Films Committee, 1969
 Golden Gate International Film Festival, San Francisco: Certificate of Merit, Short Films, 1969
 La Plata International Children's Film Festival, La Plata: Honourable Mention, 1969
 Melbourne International Film Festival, Melbourne: Silver Boomerang – Silver Boomerang, 1970
 Salerno Film Festival, Salerno: Diploma of Merit, 1970
 International Week of Cinema in Colour, Barcelona: Silver Medal, 1970
 Roshd International Film Festival, Tehran: Golden Delfan - General Release, Children and Young Adults, 1971
 San Francisco Short Film Festival, San Francisco: Certificate of Merit in Recognition of the Artistic Quality and Significance of the Work of Ryan Larkin for the film Walking, 1976
 San Francisco Short Film Festival, San Francisco: Certificate of Merit in Recognition of the Artistic Quality and Significance of the Work of Raymond Dumas  for the film Walking, 1976
 San Francisco Short Film Festival, San Francisco: Certificate of Merit in Recognition of the Artistic Quality and Significance of the Work of William Wiggins for the film Walking, 1976
 42nd Academy Awards, Los Angeles: Nominee: Academy Award for Best Animated Short Film, 1970

References

Works cited

External links
 
 Watch Walking at NFB website (requires Adobe Flash)
 

1968 films
Canadian animated short films
National Film Board of Canada animated short films
Walking
Films directed by Ryan Larkin
Animated films without speech
1960s animated short films
1968 animated films
Best Animated Short Film Genie and Canadian Screen Award winners
1960s Canadian films